Waikoukou Valley is a locality west of Auckland, in New Zealand. It was formed by Waikoukou Stream, which flows south through the Waitākere Ranges and is joined by Ararimu Stream before joining Kumeu River not far from its junction with Kaipara River. The major roads in the locality are Waikoukou Valley Road, Old North Road, Taylor Road and Peak Road.

The Matua vineyard occupies 31.68 ha of land in Waikoukou Valley.

"Wai" is the Māori word for water, and "koukou" is the morepork, an owl.

History
The Tikokopu, Wharauroa and Waikoukou rivers were dammed in the 1800s to log kauri.

A post office was established at William Blake's premises in 1861. Blake was running a saw mill by 1862, but he moved to Taranaki in 1866, with the saw mill sold the following year. Milling continued by the Wilkins brothers until the 1880s.

A flax mill was operating by 1870.

Land use moved from extraction to dairy farming in the 1920s, although there was some debate on whether to replant trees towards the end of the decade. Electricity was supplied to the area in 1930.

Demographics

Waikoukou Valley had a population of 1,728 at the 2018 New Zealand census, an increase of 210 people (13.8%) since the 2013 census, and an increase of 327 people (23.3%) since the 2006 census. There were 555 households, comprising 846 males and 882 females, giving a sex ratio of 0.96 males per female. The median age was 42.2 years (compared with 37.4 years nationally), with 381 people (22.0%) aged under 15 years, 267 (15.5%) aged 15 to 29, 876 (50.7%) aged 30 to 64, and 204 (11.8%) aged 65 or older.

Ethnicities were 94.1% European/Pākehā, 8.7% Māori, 2.3% Pacific peoples, 3.0% Asian, and 1.9% other ethnicities. People may identify with more than one ethnicity.

The percentage of people born overseas was 21.4, compared with 27.1% nationally.

Although some people chose not to answer the census's question about religious affiliation, 65.8% had no religion, 25.2% were Christian, 0.7% were Buddhist and 1.6% had other religions.

Of those at least 15 years old, 303 (22.5%) people had a bachelor's or higher degree, and 171 (12.7%) people had no formal qualifications. The median income was $44,500, compared with $31,800 nationally. 411 people (30.5%) earned over $70,000 compared to 17.2% nationally. The employment status of those at least 15 was that 759 (56.3%) people were employed full-time, 243 (18.0%) were part-time, and 27 (2.0%) were unemployed.

Notes

Populated places in the Auckland Region
Rodney Local Board Area
Valleys of New Zealand